Joseph Arthur Padway (July 25, 1891 – October 9, 1947) was an American labor lawyer and politician. Padway, who was born in Leeds, England, went to Milwaukee in 1905. Admitted to the Wisconsin bar in 1912, he was appointed legal counsel for the Wisconsin State Federation of Labor three years later. He married Lydia Paetow on March 9, 1912.

He was elected to the Wisconsin State Senate on the Socialist Party of America ticket and served in the 1925 session of the Wisconsin State Legislature. Padway was twice appointed to the Milwaukee civil court bench (1924, 1926). After 1927 he was associated with the Progressive Republicans in Wisconsin.

Padway played a major role in shaping Wisconsin labor legislation between 1915 and 1935. Upon his appointment as the first general counsel of the American Federation of Labor, he moved to Washington where he served until his death. In this capacity, he successfully defended the constitutionality of the National Labor Relations Act (Wagner Act) before the United States Supreme Court. He died in San Francisco, California.

References

External links
The Papers of Joseph Arthur Padway, University of Wisconsin-Milwaukee
The Political Graveyard

1891 births
1947 deaths
American trade union leaders
People from Leeds
Politicians from Milwaukee
Socialist Party of America politicians from Wisconsin
Wisconsin Progressives (1924)
20th-century American politicians
Wisconsin state court judges
Wisconsin state senators
British emigrants to the United States
American labor lawyers
20th-century American judges
Wisconsin State Federation of Labor people